Augustin Sesmat  ( Dieulouard -- ) was a French mathematician and logician. He was professor of history and criticism of science at the Institut Catholique de Paris in the 1930s. He was probably the first person to discover the logical hexagon, thus solving a problem posed by Aristotle.

Works

 Le système absolu classique et les mouvements réels, 1936.
 Logique. I. Les définitions, les jugements . ouvrage publiés avec le concours de CNRS, Paris, 1950, 359 pp.
 Logique. II. Les raisonnements, la logistique .  Hermann & Cie, Paris,1951, pp. 361–776.
 Dialectique, Hamelin et la philosophie chrétienne, Bloud & Gay , Paris,1955, 38 pp.

References

French mathematicians
French logicians
French philosophers
French male writers
1885 births
1957 deaths
20th-century French male writers